James Tait may refer to:

 James Tait (historian) (1863–1944), English medieval historian
 James Brian Tait (1916–2007), British bomber pilot
 James Edward Tait (1886–1918), Scottish–Canadian soldier
 James Francis Tait (1926–2014), British endocrinologist
 James Sharp Tait (1912–1998), Scottish electrical engineer and academic administrator
 James Sinclair Tait (1849–1928), Canadian physician, author and politician
 James Haldane Tait (1771–1845), Scottish naval commander
 James Tait (1834–1915), English architect; architect of Clarendon Park Congregational Church, Leicester

See also